Matias Tuomi (born 30 September 1985 in Espoo) is a professional squash player who represents Finland. He reached a career-high world ranking of World No. 117 in July 2014.

References

External links 
 
 
 

Finnish male squash players
Living people
1985 births
Competitors at the 2017 World Games
Sportspeople from Espoo